Disappointed refers to disappointment. When capitalized it may also refer to:

Music
"Disappointed" (Public Image Ltd song), 1989
"Disappointed" (Electronic song), with Neil Tennant, 1992
"Disappointed" (Ivy song), 2001
"Disappointed", by Stormzy
"Disappointed", song by Death Grips from Year of the Snitch
"Disappointed", song by Chlöe Howl
"Disappointed", Morrisey B-side to Everyday Is Like Sunday
"The Disappointed", a 1992 song by XTC

See also
Disappointment (disambiguation)